Wesley Branch Rickey (December 20, 1881 – December 9, 1965) was an American baseball player and sports executive. Rickey was instrumental in breaking Major League Baseball's color barrier by signing black player Jackie Robinson. He also created the framework for the modern minor league farm system, encouraged the Major Leagues to add new teams through his involvement in the proposed Continental League, and introduced the batting helmet.  He was posthumously elected to the Baseball Hall of Fame in 1967.

Rickey played in Major League Baseball (MLB) for the St. Louis Browns and New York Highlanders from 1905 through 1907.  After struggling as a player, Rickey returned to college, where he learned about administration from Philip Bartelme.  Returning to MLB in 1913, Rickey embarked on a successful managing and executive career with the St. Louis Browns, St. Louis Cardinals, Brooklyn Dodgers and Pittsburgh Pirates.  The Cardinals elected him to their team Hall of Fame in 2014.

Rickey also had a career in football, as a player for the professional Shelby Blues and as a coach at Ohio Wesleyan University and Allegheny College.  His many achievements and deep Christian faith earned him the nickname "the Mahātmā" (guru).

Early life
Rickey was born in Portsmouth, Ohio, the son of Jacob Frank Rickey and Emily (née Brown). Rickey was the uncle of Beth Rickey, a Louisiana political activist.

He graduated from Valley High School in Lucasville, Ohio, in 1899, and he was a catcher on the baseball team at Ohio Wesleyan University, where he obtained his B.A. Rickey was a member of the Delta Tau Delta fraternity.

Rickey was a Master Mason in Tuscan Lodge #240 in Saint Louis. After arriving in Brooklyn, Rickey joined Montauk Masonic Lodge #286 in Brooklyn.

Stricken with tuberculosis, he took the "cure" in Saranac Lake, New York in 1908 and 1909 at the Trudeau Sanatorium.  Later, he moved into the Jacob Schiff cottage.

Professional playing career
Before his front office days, Rickey played both football and baseball professionally.  He played in both baseball's minor and major leagues.

Football
In 1902, Rickey played professional football for the Shelby Blues of the "Ohio League", the direct predecessor to the modern National Football League (NFL.) Rickey often played for pay with Shelby while he was attending Ohio Wesleyan. During his time with Shelby, Rickey became friends with his teammate Charles Follis, who was the first black professional football player. He also played against him on October 17, 1903, when Follis ran for a 70-yard touchdown against the Ohio Wesleyan football team. After that game Rickey praised Follis, calling him "a wonder." It is also possible that Follis' poise and class under the pressures of such racial tension, as well as his exceptional play in spite of it, inspired Rickey to sign Jackie Robinson decades later. Rickey, however, stated his inspiration for bringing Jackie Robinson into baseball was the ill-treatment he saw received by his black catcher Charles Thomas on the Ohio Wesleyan baseball team coached by Rickey in 1903 and 1904 and the gentlemanly way Thomas handled it. When Rickey signed Robinson, Charles Thomas' story was made known in the papers

Baseball

In 1903, Rickey signed a contract with the Terre Haute Hottentots of the Class B Central League, making his professional debut on June 20. Rickey was assigned to the Le Mars Blackbirds of the Class D Iowa–South Dakota League. During this period, Rickey also spent two seasons–1904 and 1905—coaching baseball, basketball and football at Allegheny College in Pennsylvania where he also served as athletic director and as an instructor of Shakespeare, English, and freshman history.

Rickey debuted in the major leagues, with the St. Louis Browns in 1905. Sold to the New York Highlanders in 1907, Rickey could neither hit nor field while with the club, and his batting average dropped below .200. One opposing team stole 13 bases in one game while Rickey was behind the plate, which was an American League record until 1911.  Rickey also injured his throwing arm and retired as a player following that season.

Collegiate career
Rickey attended the University of Michigan, where he received his LL.B.

While at Michigan, Rickey applied for the job as Michigan's baseball coach.  Rickey asked every alumnus he had ever met to write letters to Philip Bartelme, the school's athletic director, on his behalf.  Bartelme recalled, "Day after day those letters came in."  Bartelme was reportedly impressed with Rickey's passion for baseball and his idealism about the proper role of athletics on a college campus. Bartelme convinced the dean of the law school that Rickey could handle his law studies while serving as the school's baseball coach. Bartelme reportedly called Rickey into his office to tell him he had the job if only "to put a stop to those damn letters that come in every day."  The hiring also marked the beginning of a lifelong friendship and business relationship between Rickey and Bartelme. Bartelme and Rickey worked together for most of the next 35 years, and in 1944 a California newspaper noted: "He and Rickey have had a close association in baseball ever since Bartelme was head of the athletic department of the University of Michigan where Rickey took to baseball just as a means to build up his failing health."  During his four years as head baseball coach from 1910 to 1913 his record was 68–32–4.

Managerial / Executive career

St. Louis Browns (1913–1915)
Rickey returned to the big leagues in 1913, as a front office executive with the Browns.  He was responsible for signing young George Sisler.  Rickey became the team's manager for the final 12 games of the season, and managed the team for two more full seasons, although the Browns finished under .500 both years.

Break for World War I (1917–1919)
Rickey served as an officer in the U.S. Army in France during World War I.  He commanded a chemical training unit that included Ty Cobb and Christy Mathewson. Rickey served in the 1st Gas Regiment during the war, and spent over four months as a member of the Chemical Warfare Service.

St. Louis Cardinals (1919–1942)

He then returned to St. Louis in 1919, but clashed with new Browns owner Phil Ball and jumped to the crosstown rivals Cardinals, to become team president and manager.  In 1920, Rickey gave up the team presidency to the Cards' new majority owner, Sam Breadon.

The Cardinals wore uniforms for the first time that featured the two familiar cardinal birds perched on a baseball bat over the name "Cardinals" with the letter "C" of the word hooked over the bat in 1922.  The concept of this pattern originated in a Presbyterian church in Ferguson, Missouri, at which Rickey was speaking.  He noticed a colorful cardboard arrangement featuring two cardinal birds perched on a branch on a table.  The arrangement's designer was a woman named Allie May Schmidt.  Schmidt's father, a graphic designer, assisted Rickey in creating the logo that is part of a familiar staple on Cardinals uniforms.

Under Rickey's leadership as on-the-field manager for six relatively mediocre years, the Cardinals posted winning records from 1921 to 1923.  Breadon fired him early in the 1925 season.  However, he could not deny Rickey's acumen for player development, and offered to let him stay to run the front office.  An embittered Rickey stated, "You can't do this to me, Sam. You are ruining me."  "No", Breadon responded.  "I am doing you the greatest favor one man has ever done to another."

Rickey had wisely invested in several minor league baseball clubs, using them to develop future talent and supplement the Cardinals major league roster.  At 43 years of age upon his firing, he had been a player, manager and executive in the Major Leagues.  However, there had been little indication to this point that he would ever belong in the Baseball Hall of Fame.  Although he was not the first executive titled as a general manager in Major League Baseball history — his actual title was business manager — through his activities, including inventing and building the farm system, Rickey came to embody the position of the baseball operations executive who mastered scouting, player acquisition and development and business affairs, which is the definition of the modern GM.

Second baseman Rogers Hornsby, winner of two Major League Baseball Triple Crowns, replaced Rickey to become a player-manager, and in 1926, his first full year as manager, Hornsby then led the Cardinals to their first World Series championship.

Development of the farm system
By 1930, Rickey's Cardinals, known as the "Gashouse Gang", were the class of the National League.  They won 101 games in 1931 and won the World Series in seven games.  The star of the 1931 World Series was rookie Pepper Martin, one of the first Cardinal stars that came from Branch's minor league system.  Soon, other minor league graduates joined the team, among them future hall of famers Dizzy Dean and Joe Medwick, nicknamed "Ducky", and Dean's brother Paul "Daffy" Dean.  The Deans and Medwick were integral parts of the 1934 Cardinals, who won the franchise's third World Series title.

Kenesaw Mountain Landis, the Commissioner of Baseball, was concerned that Rickey's minor league system was going to ruin baseball by destroying existing minor league teams, and he twice released over 70 Cardinal minor leaguers.  Despite Landis' efforts, Rickey's minor league system stayed in existence, and similar systems were adopted by every major league team within a few years. Arguably, the farm system saved the minor leagues, by keeping them necessary after the television age began and minor league attendance figures declined.

Rickey continued to develop the Cardinals up until the early 1940s.  In his final year at St. Louis, 1942, the Cardinals had their best season in franchise history, winning 106 games and the World Series title.  The team was led by a new crop of players developed by the Cardinals, two of whom, Enos Slaughter and Stan Musial, became Hall of Famers; and several others, among them future MVP Marty Marion, who were among the best at their position during their eras.  Even their manager Billy Southworth was a product of their farm system.

Brooklyn Dodgers (1942–1950)
When Rickey's good friend Brooklyn Dodgers general manager Larry MacPhail enlisted in the army to serve in World War II after the 1942 season, the Dodgers hired Rickey to replace him as president and general manager, ending a tenure of over two decades with the Cardinals. In 1945, the Dodger ownership reorganized, with Rickey acquiring 25% of Dodger stock to become an equal partner with three other owners.

Further innovations
Rickey continued to innovate in his time with Brooklyn.  He was responsible for the first full-time spring training facility, in Vero Beach, Florida, and encouraged the use of now-commonplace tools such as the batting cage, pitching machines, and batting helmets. He also pioneered the use of statistical analysis in baseball (what is now known as sabermetrics), when he hired statistician Allan Roth as a full-time analyst for the Dodgers in 1947. After viewing Roth's evidence, Rickey promoted the idea that on-base percentage was a more important hitting statistic than batting average. While working under Rickey, Roth was also the first person to provide statistical evidence that platoon effects were real and quantifiable.

Breaking the Color Barrier
Rickey's most memorable act with the  Dodgers involved signing Jackie Robinson, thus breaking baseball's color barrier, which had been an unwritten rule since the 1880s. This policy had continued under a succession of baseball leaders, including Landis, who was openly opposed to integrating Major League Baseball for what he regarded as legitimate reasons. Landis died in 1944, but Rickey had already set the process in motion, having sought (and gained) approval from the Dodgers Board of Directors in 1943 to begin the search for "the right man."

In early 1945, Rickey was anticipating the integration of black players into Major League Baseball.  Rickey, along with Gus Greenlee who was the owner of the original Pittsburgh Crawfords, created the United States League (USL) as a method to scout black players specifically to break the color line.  It is unclear if the league actually played the 1945 season or if it was only used as a pretense for integration. Around this time, Rickey held tryouts of black players, under the cover story of forming a new team in the USL called the "Brooklyn Brown Dodgers." The Dodgers were, in fact, looking for the right man to break the color line.

On August 28, 1945, Rickey signed Robinson, who never played in the USL, to a minor league contract. Robinson had been playing in the Negro leagues for the Kansas City Monarchs.  On October 23, 1945, it was announced that Robinson would join the Montreal Royals, the Dodgers' International League affiliate, for the 1946 season.  He would end up as the league's batting champion, and led the Royals to a dominant league championship.

There was no statute officially banning blacks from baseball, only a universally recognized unwritten rule which no club owner was prepared to break that was perpetuated by culturally entrenched racism and a desire by club owners to be perceived as representing the values and beliefs of everyday American white men. The service of black Americans in the Second World War, and the celebrated pre-war achievements of black athletes in American sports, such as Joe Louis in boxing and Jesse Owens in track, helped pave the way for the cultural shift necessary to break the barrier.

Rickey knew that Robinson would face racism and discrimination. Rickey made it clear in their momentous first meeting that he anticipated wide-scale resistance both inside and outside baseball to opening its doors to black players. As predicted by Rickey, right from the start Robinson faced obstacles among his teammates and other teams' players.  No matter how harsh the white people were towards Robinson, he could not retaliate. Robinson had agreed with Rickey not to lose his temper and jeopardize the chances of all the blacks who would follow him if he could help break down the barriers.

Red Barber recounted in Ken Burns's documentary Baseball that Rickey's determination to desegregate Major League Baseball was born out of a combination of idealism and astute business sense. The idealism was at least partially rooted in an incident involving a team for which Rickey worked early on. While managing at Ohio Wesleyan University, a black player, Charles Thomas, was extremely upset at being refused accommodation, because of his race, at the hotel where the team stayed. Though an infuriated Rickey managed to get him into the hotel for the night, he never forgot the incident and later said, "I may not be able to do something about racism in every field, but I can sure do something about it in baseball." The business element was based on the fact that the Negro leagues had numerous star athletes, and logically, the first Major League team to hire them would get the first pick of the players at an attractive price. At the time, Mexican brewery czar Jorge Pasquel was raiding America for black talent (e.g. Satchel Paige), as well as disgruntled white players, for the Mexican League with the idea of creating an integrated league that could compete on a talent level with the U.S. major leagues. However idealistic, Rickey did not compensate Monarchs ownership for the rights to obtain Robinson, nor did he pay for rights to Don Newcombe, who would also join the Dodgers from a Negro leagues club. Rickey also attempted to sign Monte Irvin but Newark Eagles business owner Effa Manley refused to allow Irvin to leave her club without compensation. When she threatened to sue him in court, Rickey stopped the pursuit of Irvin, who would later sign with the New York Giants.

Amid much fanfare, Jackie debuted, and turned out to be a success.  Robinson was baseball's first rookie of the year, and while he was often jeered by opposing baseball players, managers, and fans, he became extremely popular with the American public.  His success became the crowning achievement of Rickey's illustrious career.  His Dodgers would make the World Series that year.  Although they lost in seven games to the New York Yankees, Rickey's vision and action had set the stage for the Dodgers to be contenders for decades to come.  And it opened the door for other leaders like Larry Doby of the Cleveland Indians, who integrated the American League in 1947, as well.

Later career with Dodgers
From 1945 through 1950, Rickey was one of four owners of the Dodgers, each with one quarter of the franchise. When one of the four (John L. Smith) died, Walter O'Malley took control of that quarter. Also in 1950, Branch Rickey's contract as Dodger president expired, and Walter O'Malley decided that were Rickey to retain the job, almost all of Rickey's power would be gone; for example, he would no longer take a percentage of every franchise sale. Rickey declined a new contract as president. Then, to be a majority owner, O'Malley offered to buy Rickey's portion. Seeing no reason to hold on to the club, Rickey decided to comply. In a final act of retaliation against O'Malley, Rickey instead offered the club percentage to a friend for $1 million. His chances at complete franchise control at risk, O'Malley was forced to offer more money, and Rickey finally sold his portion for $1.05 million.

Pittsburgh Pirates (1951–1955)
Immediately upon leaving the Dodgers, Rickey was offered the position of executive vice president and general manager of the Pittsburgh Pirates by the team's new majority owner, John W. Galbreath. He joined them on November 1, 1950, one month after the 1950 Bucs, who lost 96 out of 153 games, finished in last place for only the third time in the 20th century. With an average player age of 28.6 years, they also were one of the oldest teams in the National League. Bringing several key aides with him from Brooklyn, Rickey began a tear-down/re-building process that would consume his entire five-year term as general manager. The Pirates finished eighth (and last) four times and seventh once, compiled a miserable 269–501 (.349) record, and in 1952 experienced one of the worst seasons in MLB annals, going 42–112 and lagging behind the champion Dodgers by 54 games. It was the second-worst season in franchise history, and the third-worst in modern (post-1900) baseball history. After presiding over one last-place season with the Pirates, Rickey proposed cutting the pay of power-hitting superstar Ralph Kiner.  When Kiner objected, Rickey famously quipped, "Son, we could have finished last without you!"

Perhaps his most notable innovation during his Pittsburgh tenure came during the  season, when the Pirates became the first team to permanently adopt batting helmets on both offense and defense. These helmets resembled a primitive fiberglass "miner's cap". This was the mandate of Rickey, who also owned stock in the company producing the helmets. Under Rickey's orders, all Pirate players had to wear the helmets both at bat and in the field. The helmets became a permanent feature for all Pirate hitters, but within a few weeks the team began to abandon their use of helmets on defense, partly because of their awkwardly heavy feel. Once the Pirates discarded the helmets on defense, the trend disappeared from the game.

Health problems forced Rickey to retire in 1955. The Pirates were still mired in the NL basement; they would not have another winning record until 1958. However, with an average age of 25.5, they were the youngest outfit in the Senior Circuit. Five years later, Rickey's contributions would help lead to a World Series championship for Pittsburgh in 1960. Wrote author Andrew O'Toole in 2000, "The core of the 1960 championship team [notably Roberto Clemente, Dick Groat, Bill Mazeroski, Elroy Face and Vern Law, among others] was put together and nurtured by Rickey."

Rickey fast-tracked youngsters like Law and Bob Friend, signed by his predecessor, Roy Hamey, to the majors. He recruited Groat off the Duke University campus, drafted Face and Clemente from Brooklyn's minor league system, and his scouts and minor league instructors found Mazeroski and developed him for MLB delivery in 1956. Pittsburgh's farm and scouting system would continue to be highly productive into the 1970s, especially in developing Latin American players signed by scout Howie Haak, one of the people whom Rickey had brought to the Pirates from the Dodgers.

He also held a small amount of stock in the club. But that association ended in the middle of August 1959, when, nearing his 78th birthday, Rickey took on another challenge as the chief executive of a proposed third major league, the Continental League.

President of Continental League

In , these were dramatized by the transfer of each of New York City's National League teams, the Dodgers and Giants, to California, abandoning their established fan bases. When mayor Robert F. Wagner Jr. and attorney William Shea were unsuccessful in their attempts to attract Senior Circuit teams from smaller markets (including the Pirates) to New York, Shea announced plans for a third major league in professional baseball, the Continental League, on July 27, 1959. In addition to New York, the Continental would be represented by clubs in Denver, Houston, Minneapolis–Saint Paul and Toronto, plus three additional markets to round out an eight-team league. It was scheduled to begin play in April 1961.

Three weeks after the formation of the new circuit was announced, on August 18, 1959, Rickey sold his stake in the Pirates, resigned as board chairman, and signed a 16-month contract to become the first president of the new league at a reported $50,000 annual salary. He immediately led a delegation of Continental League owners to a summit meeting in a Manhattan hotel with Commissioner of Baseball Ford Frick, the presidents of the National and American leagues, and a delegation of MLB club owners. The established leagues were wary of a new challenge to baseball's antitrust law exemption, when the chairman of the House Judiciary Committee, Emanuel Celler, a Brooklyn Democrat enraged by his borough's loss of the Dodgers, introduced legislation that would place baseball under antitrust law. This concern led Frick and his entourage to publicly treat the Continental League with respect; at the meeting, Frick asked Rickey and the other league presidents (Warren Giles and Joe Cronin) to form a committee that would set up ground rules to govern the admission of the Continental to eventual equal status with the two major leagues.

As those rules were taking shape, Rickey presided over the admission of the Continental League's three remaining founding franchises: Atlanta, Buffalo and Dallas–Fort Worth. He made public appearances—for example, as the "mystery guest" on the prime-time TV quiz show What's My Line?—to advance his view that a third, eight-team league would be more beneficial to baseball than expansion of the two existing circuits. But behind the scenes, National and American league owners were working on their own plans to expand their loops and scuttle Rickey's start-up league. In August 1960, they offered the Continental League's owners a deal: each established league would add two new franchises by 1962. In return, they demanded that the new circuit disband. Against Rickey's advice, his owners agreed to the compromise and the new league perished, still on the drawing board.

In 1961, Minneapolis–Saint Paul got a 60-year-old American League franchise, the transferred Washington Senators, with an expansion team replacing them in the capital. In 1962, the New York Mets and Houston Colt .45s were admitted to the Senior Circuit as expansion teams. By 1993, all of the Continental League's cities except Buffalo were in Major League Baseball.

Return to Cardinals
After negotiations broke down in May 1961 that would have seen Rickey take over the Mets as their first president and general manager, he went into temporary retirement. On October 29, 1962, Rickey returned to the Cardinals exactly 20 years to the day he left to become general consultant on the development of Cardinal players and special advisor to owner August A. Busch Jr.  He wanted to come home to Missouri after suffering a heart attack at his summer home in Canada a year earlier and the April 1961 death of his son, Branch Jr., who died from complications of diabetes at age 47.

But Rickey's second stint with the Cardinals was marred by controversy. He recommended that Cardinal icon Stan Musial be compelled to retire, even after the eventual Hall of Famer's stellar  season, in which Musial, 41, had finished third in the National League batting race (hitting .330 in 135 games played), and broken Honus Wagner's NL record for career hits. Rickey wrote to Busch: "He can't run, he can't field, and he can't throw. Twenty-five Musials would finish in last place." Musial would play one more campaign before retiring from the field in September 1963.

Rickey also undermined St. Louis general manager Bing Devine, who had begun his baseball career under Rickey in the late 1930s as an office boy. He was a vocal critic of one of Devine's highest profile (and most successful) trades, when he acquired veteran shortstop Groat from Pittsburgh after the 1962 season. Rickey believed that Groat, 32 at the time, was too old. Groat, however, still had two prime years left. He batted .319 and .292, and was runner-up in the National League's 1963 Most Valuable Player Award balloting. He was the NL's starting shortstop in both the 1963 and 1964 All-Star games, and helped lead the 1963 Cardinals to a second-place finish. But the 1964 team fell behind in the standings and seemed stalled in fifth place in mid-August. When Busch fired Devine on August 17 and replaced him with Rickey protégé Bob Howsam, the 82-year-old consultant and special advisor was cast as the cause of Devine's downfall. The controversial firing embarrassed Busch when the team Devine assembled caught fire in the season's final six weeks, won the National League pennant, and triumphed in the 1964 World Series. After the season, Busch terminated Rickey's contract, ending his long baseball career.

Death
A public speaker in his later years, on November 13, 1965, Rickey collapsed in the middle of a speech in Columbia, Missouri, as he was being elected to the Missouri Sports Hall of Fame. He had told a story of physical courage and was about to relate an illustration from the Bible. "Now I'm going to tell you a story from the Bible about spiritual courage," he said. Rickey murmured he could not continue, collapsed and never spoke again. He faltered, fell back into his seat and slipped onto the floor. He never regained consciousness. His brain was damaged when his breathing stopped momentarily, though his heart picked up its rhythm again. Through the next 26 days, hospitalized in a coma, there was little change.

On December 9, at about 10 p.m. he died of heart failure at Boone County Memorial Hospital in Columbia, Missouri, 11 days before his 84th birthday. Branch Rickey was interred at Rush Township Burial Park in Rushtown, Ohio, near where his parents, his widow Jane (who died in 1971), and three of his children (including Branch Jr.)  also rest. Rickey's grave overlooks the Scioto Valley, about three miles from his boyhood home in Stockdale, Ohio.

Honors and legacy
According to historian Harold Seymour:
Branch Rickey stands forth as professional baseball's counterpart of that oldest stereotype of American folklore, the shrewd hard-working, God-fearing Yankee trader.  He was also one of baseball's genuine innovators, an administrator who made a lasting imprint upon the industry....[His] seeming contradictions between profession and practice, together with this skill and oratorical obfuscation and circumlocution, caused many to regard Rickey as a hypocritical mountebank. Yet even his detractors acknowledged Rickey's industriousness, organizing genius, an unsurpassed ability to judge the potential of raw recruits.... Rickey built the Cardinals into a baseball empire that, at its peak, comprised 32 clubs, 600 or 700 players, and an investment of more than $2 million.

In addition to Rickey's election to the Baseball Hall of Fame as a contributor in 1967, in 1997 he was inducted into the St. Louis Walk of Fame, in 2009 he was elected to the College Baseball Hall of Fame.  In January 2014, the Cardinals announced Rickey among 22 former players and personnel to be inducted into the St. Louis Cardinals Hall of Fame Museum for the inaugural class of 2014.

A ballpark in Portsmouth, Ohio, once used by the Portsmouth Explorers, a charter member of the Frontier League before the club folded in 1996, is named in Rickey's honor. The Branch Rickey Arena at Ohio Wesleyan University is also named in his honor.

A section of State Highway 23 in Ohio, running north from the Franklin County border to the city of Delaware, has been named the Branch Rickey Memorial Highway.

In 1992, Rotary International of Denver, Colorado, created the Branch Rickey Award, which is given annually to a Major League Baseball player in recognition of exceptional community service. Outside of Coors Field in Denver is a monument to Rickey by the sculptor George Lundeen, dedicated in 2005, with this simple inscription:

It is not the honor that you take with you but the heritage you leave behind.

Another quotation attributed to Rickey is:

Luck is the residue of design.

Members of his family also became involved in baseball. Son Branch Jr. was an executive with the Dodgers and Pirates for over two decades prior to his 1961 death, and grandson Branch Rickey III served as a farm system director with the Pirates and Cincinnati Reds and president of the Triple-A American Association and Pacific Coast League during a 57-year baseball career. His brother Frank Wanzer Rickey (1888–1953) scouted for the Cardinals and Dodgers. Frank Rickey's son-in-law, Charles A. Hurth (1906–1969), was a longtime minor league executive who served as president of the Double-A Southern Association and, briefly in the spring of 1961, as the first general manager of the Mets when Branch Rickey and the team were still discussing a top role in the New York front office; that job ultimately went to George Weiss, the former Yankee executive.

Moreover, Rickey's influence continued to loom large after his passing, especially in the National League. One year after his 1965 death, five of the league's ten general managers—Howsam (Cardinals), Devine (Mets), Brown (Pirates), Buzzie Bavasi (Dodgers) and Bill DeWitt (Reds), as well as NL president Giles—had at one time worked under Rickey during his long executive career.

In popular culture

 In the 1950 movie The Jackie Robinson Story, he is portrayed by Minor Watson.
 In the 1996 HBO movie Soul of the Game Rickey is played by Edward Herrmann.
 In the 2013 film 42, Rickey is played by Harrison Ford.<ref>{{cite web |last=Harris |first=Aisha |url=http://www.slate.com/blogs/browbeat/2012/09/21/_42_trailer_jackie_robinson_story_with_harrison_ford_as_branch_rickey_.html |work=Slate |title=Trailer Critic 42 |date=September 21, 2012}}</ref> Rickey's great-granddaughter, actress Kelley Jakle, also appears in the film.
 Rickey is featured in the 2013 book Dissident Gardens by Jonathan Lethem.
 Rickey is in the 1999 mystery novel Hanging Curve.
 Rickey is the title character in the 1989 Edward Schmidt play Mr. Rickey Calls a Meeting, a fictionalized version of the meeting in which Rickey offered Jackie Robinson a major-league contract.

Managerial record

Head coaching record
College football

See also
 List of Major League Baseball player–managers
 List of St. Louis Cardinals owners and executives
 History of the Brooklyn Dodgers

References

Further readingBranch Rickey: Baseball's Ferocious Gentleman, by Lee Lowenfish (University of Nebraska Press); winner of the Seymour Medal for 2008, nominee for 2007 CASEY Award, Roy Kaplan's Baseball Bookshelf
 Branch Rickey: A Biography by Murray Polner Atheneum; Signet; and MacFarland, publishers
 Branch Rickey'' by Jimmy Breslin; Viking 2011

External links

 Branch Rickey at SABR (Baseball BioProject)
 

1881 births
1965 deaths
Allegheny Gators baseball coaches
Allegheny Gators football coaches
American Freemasons
Baseball coaches from Ohio
Baseball players from Ohio
Basketball coaches from Ohio
Brooklyn Dodgers executives
Brooklyn Dodgers owners
Burials in Ohio
Continental League contributors
Dallas Giants players
Jackie Robinson
Le Mars Blackbirds players
Major League Baseball catchers
Major League Baseball farm directors
Major League Baseball general managers
Major League Baseball owners
Major League Baseball player-managers
Major League Baseball team presidents
Methodists from Ohio
Michigan Wolverines baseball coaches
National Baseball Hall of Fame inductees
National College Baseball Hall of Fame inductees
New York Highlanders players
Ohio Wesleyan Battling Bishops baseball coaches
Ohio Wesleyan Battling Bishops baseball players
Ohio Wesleyan Battling Bishops football coaches
Ohio Wesleyan Battling Bishops men's basketball coaches
People from Freeport, New York 
People from Pike County, Ohio
People from Portsmouth, Ohio
Pittsburgh Pirates executives
St. Louis Browns managers
St. Louis Browns players
St. Louis Cardinals executives
St. Louis Cardinals managers
Shelby Blues players
Sportspeople from Nassau County, New York
Sportspeople from St. Louis
Terre Haute Hottentots players
United States Army officers
United States Army personnel of World War I
University of Michigan Law School alumni